Scoring over 2,000 runs in T20I format of cricket is considered a significant achievement. In 2014, New Zealand batsman Brendon McCullum became the first batsman to score 2,000 runs in T20I. He was also the first player to score 1,000 runs. He retired as the most prolific run scorer in Twenty20 International (T20Is), with a total of 2140 runs in June 2015. The record lasted for almost another 3 years until it was broken by his teammate Martin Guptill in February 2018.

In terms of innings, Pakistan's Babar Azam is the fastest (52 innings) to reach the 2,000 run mark, surpassing India's Virat Kohli, who achieved the feat in 56 innings. Currently the list of highest run-scorer is topped with Virat Kohli, Rohit Sharma, and Martin Guptill. , sixteen players—from 8 teams that are Full Members of the International Cricket Council (ICC) have scored 2,000 runs in T20Is. Out of these 18 players, 3 players are from New Zealand, 2 from England,4 from Pakistan,3from India, and 2 from Australia, and 1 from Bangladesh, Afghanistan, Ireland and South Africa.

This list contains all the players who have scored 2,000 runs in T20I. By default, the list is sorted in order of the day the feat is achieved. Overall career scores of these players will be updated on regular intervals and not on a daily basis.

Key

Players with 2,000 or more T20I runs

Player list and statistics are updated as of 26 September 2022.

See also
 List of Twenty20 International cricket records

Notes

References

Twenty20 International cricket records and statistics